Hull High (also known as Hull Street High) is an American musical teen comedy television series which aired on the NBC from August 20 to December 30, 1990. The series was created and executive produced by Gil Grant.

Synopsis
Hull High told the story of Cordell Hull High School, a hip, racially integrated school in an urban area. The series involved elements of soap opera (the ongoing and evolving relationships among teachers and students),  humor, and musical (featuring The Hull High Devils, something of a rap Greek chorus, whose songs related to the show's plot). The main adult character was history teacher John Deerborn (Will Lyman).

Similar to ABC's Cop Rock (which premiered a month after Hull High), the series' format proved unsuccessful and Hull High was canceled after nine episodes.

Production notes
The series was filmed at El Camino Real High School in Woodland Hills, Los Angeles, California. The musical numbers were choreographed by Peggy Holmes and Kenny Ortega (who also directed episodes). Songs for Hull High were written by Jon Lind, Tom Snow, and Brock Walsh. Don Was served as the series' music producer.

Cast
 Will Lyman as John Deerborn
 Nancy Valen as Donna Breedlove
 Bryan Anthony as Hull High Devil Rapper
 Mark Ballou as Mark Fuller
 Marty Belafsky as Louis Plumb
 Marshall Bell as Mr. Fancher
 Jennifer Blanc as Straight Girl
 Kristin Dattilo as D.J.
 Mark David as Mark
 Phillip DeMarks as Hull High Devil Rapper
 Holly Fields as Michelle
 Gary Grubbs as Mr. Brawley
 George Martin as Emery Dobosh
 Rowdy Metzger as Randy
 Trey Parker as Devil Rapper #1
 Carl Anthony Payne II as Hull High Devil Rapper
 Cheryl Pollak as Camilla
 Harold Pruett as Cody Rome
 Daniel Fusaro as John McCoy

Episodes

Awards and nominations

References

External links
 
 

1990 American television series debuts
1990 American television series endings
1990s American high school television series
1990s American music television series
1990s American teen drama television series
English-language television shows
NBC original programming
Television series about educators
Television series about teenagers
Television series by ABC Studios
Television shows set in Los Angeles